Kindamba is a city and seat of Kindamba District in the Pool Region of northeastern Republic of the Congo.

The city is served by Kindamba Airport.

Pool Department
Populated places in the Republic of the Congo